Brandon Miree (Born April 14, 1981) is a former American football fullback in the National Football League. He was drafted by the Denver Broncos in the seventh round of the 2004 NFL Draft. He played college football at Pittsburgh.

Miree also played for the Green Bay Packers.

College career
Miree started his college football career at Alabama, but then transferred to Pittsburgh.

Professional career
Miree was drafted in the seventh-round of the 2004 NFL Draft by the Denver Broncos. He signed with the Green Bay Packers before the 2006 season. On September 1, 2007 the Packers released him.

1981 births
Living people
Players of American football from Cincinnati
American football fullbacks
Alabama Crimson Tide football players
Pittsburgh Panthers football players
Denver Broncos players
Green Bay Packers players
Rhein Fire players